Oued Djer is a Village and commune in Blida Province, Algeria. According to the 1998 census it has a population of 5373 .

References

Communes of Blida Province
Algeria
Cities in Algeria